This is a list of some of the most commonly used coordinate transformations.

2-dimensional
Let (x, y) be the standard Cartesian coordinates, and (r, θ) the standard polar coordinates.

To Cartesian coordinates

From polar coordinates

From log-polar coordinates

By using complex numbers , the transformation can be written as

That is, it is given by the complex exponential function.

From bipolar coordinates

From 2-center bipolar coordinates

From Cesàro equation

To polar coordinates

From Cartesian coordinates

Note: solving for  returns the resultant angle in the first quadrant. To find , one must refer to the original Cartesian coordinate, determine the quadrant in which  lies (for example, (3,−3) [Cartesian] lies in QIV), then use the following to solve for :

For  in QI:

For  in QII:

For  in QIII:

For  in QIV:

This means that the inverse function will only give values in the domain of the function, but restricted to a single period. Hence, the range of the inverse function is only half a full circle.

Note that one can also use

From 2-center bipolar coordinates

Where 2c is the distance between the poles.

To log-polar coordinates from Cartesian coordinates

Arc-length and curvature

In Cartesian coordinates

In polar coordinates

3-dimensional
As φ has a range of 360° the same considerations as in polar (2 dimensional) coordinates apply whenever an arctangent of it is taken. θ has a range of 180°, running from 0° to 180°, and does not pose any problem when calculated from an arccosine, but beware for an arctangent.

If, in the alternative definition, θ is chosen to run from −90° to +90°, in opposite direction of the earlier definition, it can be found uniquely from an arcsine, but beware of an arccotangent. In this case in all formulas below all arguments in θ should have sine and cosine exchanged, and as derivative also a plus and minus exchanged.

All divisions by zero result in special cases of being directions along one of the main axes and are in practice most easily solved by observation.

To Cartesian coordinates

From spherical coordinates

So for the volume element:

From cylindrical coordinates

So for the volume element:

To spherical coordinates

From Cartesian coordinates

See also the article on atan2 for how to elegantly handle some edge cases.

So for the element:

From cylindrical coordinates

To cylindrical coordinates

From Cartesian coordinates

From spherical coordinates

Arc-length, curvature and torsion from Cartesian coordinates

See also
 Geographic coordinate conversion
 Transformation matrix

References
 

 
Coordinate transformations
Coordinate systems
Hamiltonian mechanics